The Supreme Court of the United States handed down eleven per curiam opinions during its 1999 term, which began October 4, 1999 and concluded October 1, 2000.

Because per curiam decisions are issued from the Court as an institution, these opinions all lack the attribution of authorship or joining votes to specific justices. All justices on the Court at the time the decision was handed down are assumed to have participated and concurred unless otherwise noted.

Court membership

Chief Justice: William Rehnquist

Associate Justices: John Paul Stevens, Sandra Day O'Connor, Antonin Scalia, Anthony Kennedy, David Souter, Clarence Thomas, Ruth Bader Ginsburg, Stephen Breyer

Brancato v. Gunn

Antonelli v. Caridine

Judd v. United States Dist. Court for Western Dist. of Tex.

Dempsey v. Martin

Prunty v. Brooks

Flippo v. West Virginia

In re Bauer

Texas v. Lesage

Adarand Constructors, Inc. v. Slater

Village of Willowbrook v. Olech

See also 
 List of United States Supreme Court cases, volume 528

Notes

References
 

 Journal of the Supreme Court of the United States: October 1999 Term
 Vol. 528, United States Reports
 Vol. 529, United States Reports
 Vol. 530, United States Reports

United States Supreme Court per curiam opinions
1999 per curiam